The chestnut-crested antbird (Rhegmatorhina cristata) is a species of bird in the family Thamnophilidae. It is found in Brazil and Colombia. Its natural habitat is subtropical or tropical moist lowland forests.

This species is a specialist ant-follower that relies on swarms of army ants to flush insects and other arthropods out of the leaf litter.

The chestnut-crested antbird was described by the Austrian ornithologist August von Pelzeln in 1868 and given the binomial name Pithys cristata.

References

chestnut-crested antbird
Birds of the Brazilian Amazon
Birds of the Colombian Amazon
chestnut-crested antbird
Taxonomy articles created by Polbot